Ralph de Cromwell may refer to:

Ralph de Cromwell, 1st Baron Cromwell (died 1398)
Ralph de Cromwell, 2nd Baron Cromwell
Ralph de Cromwell, 3rd Baron Cromwell (–1456)